The 2007 Women's British Open was the 31st Women's British Open, held 2–5 August at the Old Course at St Andrews in Fife, Scotland. It was the seventh as a major championship on the LPGA Tour and the first-ever women's professional event at the Old Course.

Lorena Ochoa shot a bunker-free and bogey-free 67 (−6) in the opening round and led wire-to-wire to win the first of her two major titles, four strokes ahead of runners-up Maria Hjorth and Jee Young Lee.

Prior to Ochoa, the last to win a first major at the Old Course was Tony Lema, 43 years earlier in 1964. This was the first Women's British Open sponsored by Ricoh, the previous twenty were by Weetabix.

Field

Past champions in the field

Made the cut

Missed the cut

Course

Source:
The Road Hole, No. 17, was played as a par 5 for this championship, and was the easiest hole relative to par.

Round summaries

First round
Thursday, 2 August 2007

Second round
Friday, 3 August 2007

Amateurs: Mozo (+1), Reid (+2), Choi (+4), Bell (+5), Edwards (+5), Nordqvist (+5), Smith (+5), Watson (+5), Ciganda (+7), McVeigh (+8)

Third round
Saturday, 4 August 2007

Final round
Sunday, 5 August 2007

Amateurs: Reid (+4), Smith (+9), Choi (+11), Bell (+12), Watson (+12), Mozo (+13), Nordqvist (+14), Edwards (+20)

Source:

Scorecard
Final round

Cumulative tournament scores, relative to par
{|class="wikitable" span = 50 style="font-size:85%;
|-
|style="background: Pink;" width=10|
|Birdie
|style="background: PaleGreen;" width=10|
|Bogey
|style="background: Green;" width=10|
|Double bogey
|}

References

External links
Ladies European Tour: 2007 Ricoh Women's British Open results
LPGA: 2007 Ricoh Women's British Open results

Women's British Open
Golf tournaments in Scotland
British Open
Women's British Open
Women's British Open
21st century in Fife